Space Avenue is the seventh studio album by the Finnish avant-garde progressive metal band Waltari.

Track listing
 "External" – 4:57
 "Far Away" – 5:52
 "Wolves On The Street" – 4:26
 "Progression" – 4:03
 "Blind Zone" – 4:16
 "Purify Yourself (feat. Apocalyptica)" – 5:21
 "Stars" – 4:26
 "Prime Time" – 3:57
 "Main Stream"  – 4:01
 "Look Out Tonite (feat. Apocalyptica)" – 5:56
 "Walkin' in the Neon (feat. Anita Davis)" – 4:07
 "Mad Luxury" – 5:53

Credits
 Kärtsy Hatakka – Vocals, bass, programming, keyboards
 Jariot Lehtinen – Guitar, vocals
 Roope Latvala – Guitar
 Janne Parviainen – Drums

Charts

References

External links
 Encyclopaedia Metallum page

1997 albums
Waltari albums
Albums produced by Rhys Fulber